ICF Colony is a locality in Chennai, Tamil Nadu, India, where the Integral Coach Factory, (ICF) is located. The area also consists of a bus depot and the ICF Hospital. The locality has an MTC bus depot connecting the locality to areas such as Thiruvanmiyur.

Neighborhoods
Ayanavaram
Villivakkam
Anna Nagar
Perambur
Padi
Kellys
Kilpauk
Jamalia
Periyar Nagar
Agaram
Peravallur
Jawahar Nagar
Sembium

Sub-neighbourhoods
ICF East colony
ICF West colony
ICF North colony
ICF South colony

Main roads
Chennai Tiruvallur High road (CTH road)
Ayanavaram road (Konnur High road)
New Avadi road

Connectivity

Road transport
Metropolitan Transport Corporation operates a lot of buses that ply to different parts of Chennai via. ICF Colony. The various parts of connectivity include :
Koyambedu
Parry corner
Broadway
Ambattur
Tiruninravur
Avadi
Adyar
Vadapalani
Madhavaram
Moolakadai
Chennai Egmore railway station
Puratchi Thalaivar Dr. M. G. Ramachandran Central railway station
Anna square
Marina beach
Elliott's beach
Owing to the availability of a bus terminal here, the area is always busy.

Rail transport
Nearby railway stations are :
Perambur Loco Works railway station.
Perambur Carriage Works railway station.
Perambur railway station.
Villivakkam railway station.
ICF Colony is also well connected to :
Puratchi Thalaivar Dr. M. G. Ramachandran Central railway station, Chennai.
Chennai Egmore railway station.
by both rail and road transport.

References

Neighbourhoods in Chennai